Ottavino may refer to:

Surname
 Adam Ottavino (born 1985), American professional baseball player

Musical instruments
 Ottavino, alternative name for the piccolo
 Ottavini, a miniature virginals

See also
 Ottavinello, a red wine grape